The 1970 Massachusetts gubernatorial election was held on November 3, 1970. Acting Governor Francis W. Sargent was elected to a four-year term. He defeated incumbent Boston Mayor Kevin H. White in the general election.

This was the first Massachusetts election in which the governor and lieutenant governor were elected as a ticket rather than separately.

Republican primary

Governor

Candidates

Declared
Francis Sargent, acting Governor

Acting Governor Francis Sargent was unopposed for renomination.

Lieutenant Governor

Candidates

Declared
Donald R. Dwight, Commissioner of Finance and Administration

Eliminated at convention
Frank Harlan Freedman, Mayor of Springfield
John M. Quinlan, State Senator

Withdrew
Martin A. Linsky, State Representative

Campaign

Convention
With Sargent's support, Dwight won the endorsement of the state party at the Republican convention. State Rep. Martin A. Linsky was Sargent's original choice for the nomination, however two weeks before the convention, Linsky dropped out of the race after it was revealed that police officers had once stopped his car and informed him that the woman was traveling with was a prostitute. After Linsky dropped out, Sargent endorsed Dwight.

Results

Democratic primary

Governor

Candidates

Declared
Francis X. Bellotti, former Lieutenant Governor
Maurice A. Donahue, President of the Massachusetts Senate 
Kenneth O'Donnell, former aide to President John F. Kennedy
Kevin White, mayor of Boston

Campaign

Convention 
Donahue won the vote of the state convention held on June 15 at the Curry Hicks Cage. Donahue received 697 votes, White received 589, and the remaining 78 went to Bellotti.

Results
Despite losing at the convention, White went on to win the Democratic Primary, defeating Donahue by 12,940 votes.

Lieutenant Governor

Candidates

Declared
 Rocco Antonelli, Somerville Treasurer
 John J. Craven, Jr., member of Boston School Committee
 Kathleen Ryan Dacey, member of Boston School Committee
Michael Dukakis, State Representative
James McCormack, attorney

Results

General election
Sargent defeated White by 259,354 votes. He won 11 of the Massachusetts' 14 counties and beat White in his home city of Boston 54–45%.

Results

Results by county

See also
 1969–1970 Massachusetts legislature

References

1970 United States gubernatorial elections
Gubernatorial
1970
November 1970 events in the United States